Kangmar Town (Chinese: 康马镇) is a town in the Kangmar County of the Shigatse Prefecture in the Tibet Autonomous Region of the China, at an elevation of 5,358 m (17,581 ft). It lies very close to the border with Bhutan.

Populated places in Tibet
Township-level divisions of Tibet